Franz Runge (5 July 1904 – 30 November 1975) was an Austrian footballer. He played in three matches for the Austria national football team from 1927 to 1928.

References

External links
 

1904 births
1975 deaths
Austrian footballers
Austria international footballers
Place of birth missing
Association footballers not categorized by position